Captain Sir Alastair Sturgis Aird  (14 January 1931 – 30 September 2009) was a British royal courtier.

Aird was the second son of Colonel Malcolm Henry Aird O.B.E. (1899–1965), of the 9th Lancers, who, as son of Malcolm Rucker Aird, was a grandson of Sir John Aird, 1st Baronet, and his wife Joan Meredith, née Sturgis. He was educated at Eton and the Royal Military Academy Sandhurst and joined The 9th Queen's Royal Lancers in 1951.

From 1960 to 1964, he was a Temporary Equerry to the Queen Mother and then her Assistant Private Secretary and Extra Equerry from 1964 to 1973, Comptroller from 1974 to 2002 and Private Secretary and Equerry from 1993 to 2002. After Queen Elizabeth's death in 2002, Sir Alastair was made an Extra Equerry to The Queen in 2003.

On 22 July 1963, he married Fiona Violet (née Myddelton) LVO, who was an Extra Lady-in-Waiting to Princess Margaret from 1960 to 2002. The couple lived in Dorset and had two daughters. The elder, Caroline, is a god-child of Princess Margaret.

Honours
 He received the Queen Elizabeth II Version of the Royal Household Long and Faithful Service Medal in 1980 for 20 years of service to the Royal Family with a 40 year service bar received in 2000.
 He was appointed as a Member (4th Class) of the Royal Victorian Order (MVO) in the 1969 Queen's Birthday Honours List.
 He was upgraded to Commander of the Royal Victorian Order (CVO) in the 1977 New Years Honours List.
 He received the UK Version of the Queen Elizabeth II Silver Jubilee Medal in 1977.
 He was upgraded to Knight Commander of the Royal Victorian Order (KCVO) in the 1984 Queen's Birthday Honours List. This allowed him to be called "Sir Alastair Aird"
 He was upgraded to Knight Grand Cross of the Royal Victorian Order (GCVO) in the 1997 New Years Honours List.
 * He received the UK Version of the Queen Elizabeth II Golden Jubilee Medal in 2002.

References

External links
Sir Alastair Aird - Daily Telegraph obituary

1931 births
2009 deaths
9th Queen's Royal Lancers officers
Equerries
Knights Grand Cross of the Royal Victorian Order
People educated at Eton College
Graduates of the Royal Military Academy Sandhurst